Henry Clay Bates (January 29, 1843 – March 12, 1909), frequently known as H. C. Bates, was a Vermont lawyer and politician who served as the 42nd lieutenant governor of Vermont and as a judge of the Insular Government of the Philippine Islands.

Early life
Henry Clay Bates was born in Derby Line, Vermont on January 29, 1843.  He was educated at Derby Academy, taught school in Vermont and Maine, and studied law in Derby and Charleston before enlisting for the Civil War.

Military service
Bates served as a member of Company C, 4th Massachusetts Heavy Artillery.  After the war he was an active member of the Grand Army of the Republic.

Early career
Bates resumed his legal studies after leaving the Army, attained admission to the bar in 1866 and practiced law in St. Johnsbury.  A Republican, he served in numerous local offices, including Superintendent of Schools of Guildhall and Town Meeting Moderator of St. Johnsbury.

Bates also served as Caledonia County State's Attorney from 1880 to 1882 and 1892 to 1894.  From 1886 to 1890 Bates was a member of the Vermont Senate and served as Senate President.

Bates served in the Vermont House of Representatives from 1896 to 1897.  In 1898 he won election as Lieutenant Governor and served until 1900.

He participated in numerous county and state Republican conventions, and was a Delegate to the 1900 Republican National Convention.

Territorial judge
In 1901 Bates was appointed a judge for the 9th district of the Court of First Instance, Manila, a position within the Insular Government of the Philippine Islands.  He served until his 1907 resignation, afterwards living in retirement in Berkeley, California.

Death and burial
Bates died in Berkeley on March 12, 1909, after having been ill as the result of his service in the Philippines.  He was buried at Smithland Cemetery (Little Sioux Township Cemetery)  in Smithland, Iowa, where his wife's family resided.

Family
In 1866, Bates married Laura E. Jenness of Morgan, Vermont.  They were the parents of one son who lived to adulthood, attorney Jerry Dickerman Bates (1869-1952), who was usually referred to as J. Dickerman Bates.

References

External links

1843 births
1909 deaths
People from Derby, Vermont
People from St. Johnsbury, Vermont
Politicians from Berkeley, California
People of Vermont in the American Civil War
Vermont lawyers
State's attorneys in Vermont
Republican Party members of the Vermont House of Representatives
Republican Party Vermont state senators
Presidents pro tempore of the Vermont Senate
Lieutenant Governors of Vermont
United States federal judges appointed by William McKinley
Burials in Iowa
Lawyers from Berkeley, California